The 1964 Water Polo European Cup was the inaugural edition of LEN's premier competition for men's water polo clubs. The competition consisted of two round-robin stages, and it was contested by fifteen national champions. The first stage was held February 21–23, and it comprised a nine-team group in Naples and a six-team group in Magdeburg. The final stage, held in March, was originally planned to be contested by the two top teams from each group, but LEN later expanded it to six teams. Partizan won all five games to win the championship, while Dynamo Moscow was the runner-up.

Preliminary round losers

Final round

References 

LEN Champions League seasons
1964 in water polo